Alex Brundle (born 7 August 1990) is a British racing driver and broadcaster who currently competes in the FIA World Endurance Championship with Inter Europol Competition. He was the 2016 European Le Mans Series champion (LMP3) and is the son of Formula One driver-turned-commentator Martin Brundle. He attended Oakham School in Rutland.

Career

Karting and T Cars
Brundle drove a kart for the first time at the age of eight. He began his car racing career in 2006 by competing in the T Cars championship, a saloon car-based series for drivers aged 14 to 17. He finished eighth in the championship,

Formula Palmer Audi
In the closing months of 2006, Brundle moved to open-wheel racing by taking part in the Formula Palmer Audi Autumn Trophy, in which he finished 21st overall. For 2007, he stayed in the category for the season's main championship, finishing eleventh, and also returned to the Autumn Trophy afterwards, improving to eighth.

In 2008, he returned to FPA for a second season, taking a pole position and three podium finishes on his way to sixth position in the championship. His father Martin, inspired by his son's progress, also raced in the round of the championship held at Spa-Francorchamps.

FIA Formula Two Championship
Brundle signed to drive for the relaunched FIA Formula Two Championship in 2009. He drove car number 5 in the series, and joined Jolyon Palmer and Jack Clarke in graduating to it from the previous year's FPA championship. He finished nineteenth in the championship, amassing five points.

British Formula Three
Brundle competed in the 2010 British Formula 3 Championship, driving for the T-Sport team. He finished 17th after contesting all 30 rounds, scoring 11 points with a best finish of 8th.

Return to FIA Formula Two Championship
Brundle returned to Formula Two for the 2011 season. He struggled during his first race weekend of the season at Silverstone, but took pole position for the first race at Magny Cours, and secured a podium finish in both of the weekend's races. Brundle later got a third podium finish with a 3rd place at race one at Monza. Brundle finished the season 7th in the standings making him the most successful British driver of the 2011 Formula Two season.

GP3 Series
On 3 February 2012, Brundle was signed to race in the 8-round 2012 GP3 Series by Carlin Motorsport. The season followed the European leg of the Formula One Championship and was considered a stepping stone into the GP2 Series.

On 13 May 2012, Brundle obtained points in his debut race with a 10th-place finish at the Feature Race of the Spanish Grand-Prix. He then subsequently achieved 8th place in the sprint race the following day.

On 29 July 2012 Brundle took his first GP3 podium finish in race 2 of the Budapest event

Formula E
Alex Brundle signed on 12 February 2014 to become part of the Formula E Drivers Club in the new FIA championship for electric vehicles.

Sportscars

Brundle made his Le Mans debut in 2012, piloting a Greaves Motorsport-run Zytek-Nissan LMP2 alongside his father. He also contested the Le Mans Series for the team, who enter 2012 as reigning champions. Martin and Alex won the Woolf Barnato Trophy for becoming the highest finishing British drivers in a British car in the 2012 Le Mans 24 Hours

Brundle competed in the 2013 FIA World Endurance Championship season, finishing second in the championship for OAK Racing in LMP2 class and second in the 2013 24 Hours of Le Mans in the LMP2 class.

After finishing fifth at the 2014 Rolex 24 at Daytona while driving for Muscle Milk Pickett Racing, he returned to OAK for the rest of the 2014 United SportsCar Championship season North American Endurance Cup events at Sebring International Raceway, Watkins Glen International, and Road Atlanta, respectively. Brundle won the Total Pole Award for the most pole positions scored in the 2014 United SportsCar Championship season

Brundle returned to the European Le Mans Series in 2016 winning the championship with United Autosports scoring a pole, three wins and two further podiums on his way to championship victory. Brundle also joined G-Drive racing for the last five rounds of the 2016 FIA World Endurance Championship season winning the last three races of the series and taking one further podium.

Broadcasting
During his racing career Brundle has also served as a commentator for various motorsport series when not racing himself. He is best known for his commentary on select rounds of the FIA Formula 2 Championship and FIA Formula 3 Championship, working alongside lead commentator Alex Jacques.

Racing record

Career summary

† As Brundle was a guest driver, he was ineligible to score points.
* Season still in progress.

Complete FIA Formula Two Championship results
(key) (Races in bold indicate pole position) (Races in italics indicate fastest lap)

Complete British Formula 3 International Series results 
(key) (Races in bold indicate pole position; races in italics indicate fastest lap)

Complete GP3 Series results
(key) (Races in bold indicate pole position) (Races in italics indicate fastest lap)

Complete 24 Hours of Le Mans results

Complete European Le Mans Series results

Complete FIA World Endurance Championship results

† As Brundle was a guest driver, he was ineligible to score points.
* Season still in progress.

Complete WeatherTech SportsCar Championship results
(key)(Races in bold indicate pole position)

References

External links
Official website
Alex Brundle career details at driverdb.com

1990 births
Living people
Sportspeople from King's Lynn
People educated at Oakham School
English racing drivers
Formula Palmer Audi drivers
FIA Formula Two Championship drivers
British Formula Three Championship drivers
GP3 Series drivers
24 Hours of Le Mans drivers
FIA World Endurance Championship drivers
Blancpain Endurance Series drivers
24 Hours of Daytona drivers
WeatherTech SportsCar Championship drivers
European Le Mans Series drivers
24 Hours of Spa drivers
Carlin racing drivers
T-Sport drivers
Greaves Motorsport drivers
OAK Racing drivers
ART Grand Prix drivers
United Autosports drivers
G-Drive Racing drivers
R-Motorsport drivers
Jota Sport drivers
Manor Motorsport drivers
Aston Martin Racing drivers
Fortec Motorsport drivers
Nürburgring 24 Hours drivers